Susan Miller is an American astrologer. She is the author of eleven bestselling books and she had 17 million readers from both her website "Astrologyzone.com" and mobile app in 2019.

Miller is known for her lengthy, personalized horoscopes, with them generally being more than 1000 words long. Besides her website and app, Miller uses social media sites like Instagram and Twitter to engage her readers. Her website is free for viewing but her complete readings require a subscription. She is a regular columnist for various magazines including InStyle and Vogue. Her website had 310 million views in 2018.

A significant part of her subscribers comprises the younger millennial generation. She is especially popular in the UK with the Guardian saying, "[for any millennial], she is the queen of fortune telling, single-handedly responsible for fuelling their obsession with all things celestial. Somehow she has managed to turn the mystical, ancient pseudo-science of astrology into a world-wide phenomenon".  Miller has a celebrity following which further increased her general popularity. They include Cameron Diaz, Justin Theroux, Pharrell Williams, Kirsten Dunst, Lindsay Lohan, Katy Perry, and Alexa Chung. She is renowned in the fashion industry and various people from it appreciated her work including Glenn O'Brien, Cynthia Rowley, Bevy Smith, Gloria Vanderbilt and Mickey Boardman.

Despite focusing mainly on personal horoscopes, Miller has attempted predicting national events. She was wrong about Donald Trump losing the 2016 US elections and Hillary Clinton's email controversy not impeding her campaign but right about Barack Obama's 2012 re-election. Her official stance on astrology is that "[it] can give her insight into the circumstances of the future, but not necessarily the outcome." On this, Gabrielle Bluestone from the New York Times, wrote that her forecasts are "kindly advice on living what she deems a 'wholesome life'"; adding that "No matter what happens, she reassures her followers each month, you’re going to be fine, and if you’re not, here are some ways to cope." Bluestone further compares her appeal to that of a mental health counselor who uses astrology instead of the DSM-5. After the start of the COVID-19 pandemic, Miller received backlash from some of her followers for prediction earlier in January, saying 2020 would "be a great year, and it will be a prosperous year". 

Miller was born in the late 1950s. Miller was homeschooled and her mother taught her astrology. She graduated with an MA in business from the New York University. She initially used to work as a photography agent. She began writing horoscopes for Time Warner in the 1990s. She lives in Upper East Side, Manhattan, and has two daughters, Diana and Chrissie. Diana works in talk-show host James Corden's "Carpool Karaoke" series and Chrissie works for the company Warby Parker. Miller suffers from chronic illnesses that she had since she was fourteen. She occasionally gets bouts of them and regularly misses her forecast deadlines due to it.

References

External links 
 

American astrologers
People from the Upper East Side
New York University alumni
1950s births
Living people